The red tailed tinfoil or red tailed tinfoil barb (Barbonymus altus) is a species of freshwater cyprinid fish from South-East Asia. It lives in the  Mekong and Chao Phraya river basins.

References 

 

Barbonymus
Fish described in 1868
Freshwater fish of Asia
Taxa named by Albert Günther